This Is Jackie DeShannon is an LP album by Jackie DeShannon, released by Imperial Records under catalog number LP-9286 as a monophonic recording in 1965, and later in stereo under catalog number LP-12286 the same year. The cover was credited to Woody Woodward and the photography to Ivan Nagy.

Track listing

References

1965 albums
Jackie DeShannon albums
Albums produced by Burt Bacharach
Imperial Records albums